The men's individual archery event at the 2004 Summer Olympics was part of the archery programme. Its final was held on 19 August at the Panathinaiko Stadium.

Ranking round
The Korean archers, medal favorites in both men's and women's competition, ranked 1st (Im Dong-hyun), 4th (Park Kyung-mo), and 5th (Jang Yong-ho) in the men's individual ranking round. Im's score of 687 set a new world record for 72 arrows, breaking the previous one set in 1995 by fellow Korean Shim Young-sung. It is not recognized by the International Olympic Committee as an Olympic record, however, as the ranking round took place on 12 August, before the 2004 opening ceremony. The round was held at Dekelia Air Force Base.

The bracket setup (with 4th- and 5th-ranked archers facing off in the quarterfinals if undefeated and the winner of that match facing the 1st-ranked archer in the semifinals) meant that the Korean men could do no better than gold and bronze. Marco Galiazzo of Italy in 2nd and Magnus Petersson of Sweden in 3rd rounded out the top five, with Dmytro Hrachov in 6th with the same score as 5th-ranked Jang of Korea.

The three medalists of the 2000 Summer Olympics, Simon Fairweather, Vic Wunderle, and Wietse van Alten, all competed in 2004. None placed higher than 14th in the ranking round (van Alten) and only Wunderle made it to the quarterfinals.

Competition bracket

Section 1

Section 2

Section 3

Section 4

Finals

Event summary
Round of 64
The first round of elimination, held on 16 August, narrowed the field from 64 archers to 32 in a standard single-elimination bracket. The loser of each match received a final rank between 33 and 64, depending on his score in the round.  Each archer fired six ends of three arrows, for a total possible score of 180.  Oleksandr Serdyuk of Ukraine had the highest score in the round, with 164.

The first upset of the day belonged to 43rd-ranked Vic Wunderle of the United States, who defeated 22nd-ranked Majhi Sawaiyan of India. The United States were on the losing end of an even larger upset, though, when Butch Johnson lost to Ron van der Hoff of the Netherlands. The biggest upset occurred when 52nd-ranked Tashi Peljor of Bhutan defeated 13th-ranked Jocelyn de Grandis of France to become the lowest ranked archer to advance.

Round of 32
As in the round of 64, archers who advanced to the round of 32 fired six ends of three arrows in the second round of elimination. This round, on 18 August, narrowed the field from 32 to 16 archers, with winners advancing and losers receiving a final rank between 17 and 32 depending on their score in the round. Im Dong-hyun of Korea scored the highest in the round, missing the Olympic record by 1 point with a score of 171. 48th-ranked Satyadev Prasad of India was the lowest ranked archer to advance.

Vic Wunderle of the United States continued to have success in head-to-head competition, eliminating 11th-ranked Wang Cheng-pang of Chinese Taipei. In an astonishing match, 31st-ranked Laurence Godfrey, Great Britain eked out a victory over 2nd-ranked Magnus Petersson of Sweden. Two other top-ten-ranked archers fell when 27th-ranked Xue Haifeng of China defeated 6th-ranked Dmytro Hrachov of Ukraine and 25th-ranked Hasse Pavia Lind lost to Oleksandr Serdyuk. One of the Korean archers, Park Kyung-mo, nearly fell to Kazakhstani Stanislav Zabrodskiy when Zabrodskiy tied Park through the first 18 arrows and scored a 10 on the first tie-break. Park also scored a 10, and followed it up with a second 10 which Zabrodskiy could not match. A tie-break was also needed in the match between Viktor Ruban of Ukraine and Wang Cheng-pang of Chinese Taipei, which Ruban won 9–8.

Round of 16
The round of 16 was held on 19 August and followed the same 18-arrow format as the previous two rounds as it narrowed the field to eight quarterfinalists.

Quarterfinals
The first round of 12-arrow matches was the quarterfinals on 19 August. Winners advanced to the semifinals while losers received a final rank between 5 and 8 depending on score in the quarterfinals. The high score of the round was notched by Tim Cuddihy, with 112. In a see-saw battle, Marco Galiazzo took a lead over Vic Wunderle in the third end. In a tense final end, Wunderle closed the gap. Galiazzo, needing an 8 to tie on the last arrow, shot a 9 to advance and end Wunderle's run. In a surprise, both of the remaining Korean archers fell to Hiroshi Yamamoto and Tim Cuddihy in 1-point matches eliminating them from medal contention. Laurence Godfrey had the most decisive victory of the round, a still-close 2-point victory of Chen Szu Yuan.

Semifinals
Yamamoto and Cuddihy both tied the Olympic record for a 12-arrow match (set by Oh Kyo-moon in 1996) by tying their semifinal match at 115 on 19 August. In the tie-breaker, Yamamoto shot first and hit a 10.  Cuddihy was unable to match this, shooting a 9 to drop out of gold medal contention.

Bronze medal match
The bronze medal match was held on 19 August as well.  The winner received the bronze medal while the loser took fourth place. Cuddihy defeated Godfrey in a close match.

Final
The gold medal match on 19 August pitted a first-time-Olympian Italian against a veteran Japanese archer, with the favored Koreans being conspicuously absent. The match consisted of 12 arrows, with the winner taking gold and the loser receiving a silver medal.

With a pair of 10s in the first end, Hiroshi Yamamoto took a quick lead of 1 point over Marco Galiazzo. In the second end, Galiazzo missed perfection by only 1 point, scoring 29 to Yamamoto's 27 to reverse the lead.  He hit another pair of 10s in the third end, increasing his lead to 2 points going into the final end. Galiazzo maintained the lead through the final three arrows, winning Italy's first Olympic gold medal in archery. Yamamoto's silver was his second Olympic medal, joining the bronze medal that he won in 1984.

References

Men's individual
Olympics
Men's events at the 2004 Summer Olympics